Gulikan Theyyam (Thekkan Gulikan) or Guliga Theyyam (Thekkan Guligan) is worshiped as the Lord Shiva. Gulikan Theyyam is part of the Kaliyattam, a popular religious folk dance in the Indian state of Kerala. In the Tulu Nadu region this deity is worshiped as Guliga Daiva.

Gulikan is worshiped in small shrines called Gulikan Kavus. The most famous and powerful one is at Nileshwar in the district of Kasaragod and is popularly known as the Benkanakavu [Veeranakavu]. Nileshwar derives its name from Lord Shiva in the form of Neeleswaram or the Blue God. Benganakavu is located at the centre of Nileshwar.

Guliga is believed to be due to the presence of the God Guligan in Benkanakavu. The adjacent Koroth Nair Tharavadu, Kazhakakkar, and Kolakkar organize the Theyyam festival in Benanakavu once every two years. It is performed in other temples. In Kozhikode near Nadapuram. A temple named Pattare Paradevatha Kshethram performs Gulikan Theyyam annually.

See also
 Buta Kola
 Theyyam

References

Theyyam